Never Too Late is a 1996 Canadian comedy-drama film starring Olympia Dukakis, Jean Lapointe, Cloris Leachman and Corey Haim. It was filmed in Montreal, Quebec.

Plot summary
Joseph, Rose, and Olive suspect Carl, the owner of a retirement home, of misusing the funds of the home's residents. Together they set out to see that no one takes advantage of their unhealthy friend Woody.

Cast
 Olympia Dukakis as Rose
 Cloris Leachman as Olive
 Jan Rubeš as Joseph
 Matt Craven as Carl
 Jean Lapointe as Woody
 Corey Haim as Max

Awards
At the 17th Genie Awards in 1996, Paola Ridolfi received a nomination for Best Art Direction/Production Design, and Donald Martin was nominated for Best Original Screenplay.

References

External links
 
 
 
 

1996 films
1996 comedy-drama films
English-language Canadian films
Canadian comedy-drama films
Films directed by Giles Walker
Films scored by Normand Corbeil
Films shot in Montreal
1990s English-language films
1990s Canadian films